William J. Sweeney may refer to:

 Bill Sweeney (pitcher) (1858–1903), baseball pitcher
 William J. Sweeney (Wisconsin politician), member of the Wisconsin State Assembly